Farsan (also Romanized as Fārsān; also known as Fārsā, Fārsīān, and Farsūn) is a city in the Central District of Farsan County, Chaharmahal and Bakhtiari province, Iran, and serves as capital of the county. At the 2006 census, its population was 26,219 in 5,665 households. The following census in 2011 counted 28,013 people in 7,190 households. The latest census in 2016 showed a population of 30,504 people in 8,400 households. The city is populated by Lurs.

References 

Farsan County

Cities in Chaharmahal and Bakhtiari Province

Populated places in Chaharmahal and Bakhtiari Province

Populated places in Farsan County

Luri settlements in Chaharmahal and Bakhtiari Province